Mayestan may refer to:
 Mayestan-e Bala
 Mayestan-e Pain